Burwash Landing is a small community, at historical mile 1093 on the Alaska Highway, in Yukon, Canada along the southern shore of Kluane Lake.

The present location of Burwash Landing was first used as a summer camp by the Southern Tutchone Athabascans until a trading post was built in the early 1900s by the Jacquot brothers.

The majority of the population are Aboriginal peoples, First Nations. The community is the administrative centre of the Kluane First Nation. In addition to the Alaska Highway, the community is served by the Burwash Airport.

It is the home of the Kluane Museum of Natural History and the Kluane First Nation, and also home to the world's largest gold pan.

Geography 
The elevation can be higher in some places and lower in the others. Burwash Landing is located on the Historic Milepost 1093 Alaska (Alcan) Highway. It sits on the northwest shore of Kluane Lake. Several prominent geographic features have been renamed in Southern Tutchone language.

Climate 
Burwash Landing has a typical subarctic climate (Köppen climate classification Dfc), bordering on a dry-winter subarctic climate (Köppen climate classification Dwc).

Demographics 

Southern Tutchone people 
Burwash landing is the traditional home of the Southern Tutchone Athabascans. It used to be a summer camp. A revival of the Southern Tutchone language and culture has been taking place in this quiet lakeside community. This is readily apparent to visitors when they pull into town and are met with Southern Tutchone street and traffic signs, within and nearby Burwash Landing. Several prominent geographic features have been renamed in Southern Tutchone and signs can be seen along the Alaska (Alcan) Highway.

Burls
Burwash Landing is known for its black spruce burls. Burls start as an irritation in the spruce. The tree sends extra sap as healant, which creates a growth (burl). Burls are either "green," harvested from live trees in the spring, or they are "dry burls," taken from dead burl trees. Burls are peeled off their bark and used in their natural form as fenceposts, for example, or they may be shaped and finished into a variety of objects, such as bowls. Check the Burlbilly Hill on the Milepost 1061.6, the visitor will see rows of "burly logs" on the hill.

References

External links 

 Burwash Landing and Destruction Bay at the Government of Yukon
 tourist info
 Kluane First Nation

Settlements in Yukon
Southern Tutchone